{{DISPLAYTITLE:Mu2 Gruis}}

Mu2 Gruis, Latinized from μ2 Gruis, is a yellow-hued star or star system in the southern constellation of Grus. It is a suspected astrometric binary, showing a variation in proper motion due to gravitational acceleration. Mu2 Gruis is visible to the naked eye with an apparent visual magnitude of 5.10. The distance to this system, as determined using an annual parallax shift of 13.2 mas as seen from the Earth, is around 248 light years. It is drifting further away with a heliocentric radial velocity of +12.5 km/s.

The primary component is an evolved giant star with a stellar classification of G8 III. It is a periodic variable star, showing a change in brightness with an amplitude of 0.004 magnitude at the rate of 7.50983 times per day. With the supply of hydrogen at its core exhausted, the star has cooled and expanded until now it has 10 times the radius of the Sun. It is radiating 56 times the luminosity of the Sun from its swollen photosphere at an effective temperature of 5,009 K.

References

G-type giants
Astrometric binaries

Grus (constellation)
Gruis, Mu2
Durchmusterung objects
211202
109973
8488